Kaohsiung International Airport is a station on the Red line of Kaohsiung MRT in Siaogang District, Kaohsiung, Taiwan.

Station overview

The station is a two-level, underground station with an island platform and seven exits. It is 195 metres long and is located at the intersection of Jhongshan 4th Rd and Dayeh North Rd.

This station was the first time a subway network had been linked to an airport in Taiwan. In Chinese, this station and Nangang Software Park station on the Taipei Metro share the longest subway station names in Taiwan.

Around the station
 Kaohsiung International Airport
 Kaohsiung Astronomical Museum
 Kaohsiung Park

References

2008 establishments in Taiwan
Airport railway stations in Taiwan
Kaohsiung Metro Red line stations
Railway stations opened in 2008